Carneros Creek, formerly Arroyo de Los Carneros (Creek of the Rams) is a stream with its source located on the east slope of the Temblor Range in San Luis Obispo County.  It flows generally westward, until it emerges from the foothills of the Temblor Range, where it turns northwestward until it terminates at its confluence with Santos Creek, northwest of the Bacon Hills, in Kern County, California.

History
Arroyo de Los Carneros was a stream and a watering place on El Camino Viejo between Chico Martinez Creek in the south and Aguaje de en Media to the north.  The watering place of Carneros Spring is located at the foot of Carneros Rocks an outcropping of Vaqueros sandstone, to their east and south of the creek before it emerges from the foothills of the Temblor Range.  It may have been named for the Bighorn Sheep that once lived in the area.

References

Rivers of San Luis Obispo County, California
Temblor Range
El Camino Viejo